The 2006 Paris Motor Show (Mondial de l'Automobile) took place from 30 September to 15 October 2006, in Paris expo Porte de Versailles, Paris, France.

Introductions

Production cars

 Alfa Romeo 8C Competizione
 Audi A3 1.8 TFSI
 Audi S3
 Audi A4 2.8 FSI
 Audi R8
 Bentley Arnage facelift
 BMW 3 Series Coupe
 BMW X3 facelift
 BMW X5
 Chevrolet WTCC Ultra concept
 Chrysler Sebring (Europe introduction)
 Citroën C4 Picasso long wheelbase
 Citroën C4 WRC
 Citroën C-Métisse diesel-hybrid concept
 Dacia Logan (facelift) and Dacia Logan MCV (station wagon) 
 Daihatsu D-Compact X-Over prototype
 Daihatsu Materia (Europe introduction)
 Dodge Avenger concept
 Dodge Nitro (Europe introduction)
 Fiat Panda Sport
 Ford Iosis X concept
 Ford Mondeo Wagon concept
 Great Wall Hover (Europe introduction)
 Honda Civic Type-R
 Honda CR-V
 Honda FR-V facelift
 Hyundai Arnejs concept
 Hyundai Grandeur 2.2 CRDi
 Hyundai Coupé facelift (Europe introduction)
 Kia cee'd 5-door hatchback & station wagon
 Kia Opirus facelift (Europe introduction)
 Kia pro_cee'd 3-door hatchback concept
 Lamborghini Gallardo Nera (Special Edition)
 Lancia Delta HPE concept
 Lancia Ypsilon facelift
 Land Rover Defender facelift
 Land Rover Freelander
 Landwind Fashion
 Lexus LS600h (Europe introduction)
 Maserati GranSport
 Mazda CX-7 (Europe introduction)
 Mazda MX-5 Power Retractable Hard Top
 Mercedes-Benz CL-Class
 Mercedes-Benz CL 63 AMG
 Mercedes-Benz SLR McLaren 722 Edition
 MINI Cooper and Cooper S
 Mitsubishi Outlander concept (Europe introduction)
 Mitsubishi Pajero
 Nissan Qashqai
 Opel Antara
 Opel Corsavan concept
 Peugeot 207 Epure concept
 Peugeot 207 Spyder track car
 Peugeot 908 HDi FAP Le Mans
 Peugeot 908 RC concept
 Renault Koléos concept
 Renault Nepta concept
 Renault Scenic facelift
 Renault Twingo concept
 SEAT Altea XL
 Škoda Joyster concept
 Škoda Octavia Scout
 Smart Fortwo Edition Red (Special Edition)
 SsangYong Actyon (Europe introduction)
 Subaru B9 Tribeca (Europe introduction)
 Subaru Impreza 1.5 R (Europe introduction)
 Subaru Legacy/Outback facelift (Europe introduction)
 Suzuki Splash concept
 Suzuki Swift Sport (Europe introduction)
 Toyota Auris Space concept
 Toyota Yaris TS
 Volkswagen CrossGolf
 Volkswagen Iroc concept
 Volkswagen Touareg facelift
 Volkswagen Touran facelift
 Volvo C30

Motorsport cars
 Audi R10 TDI Diesel Le Mans Prototype (Winning Car)
 Citroen C4 WRC 
 Porsche 911 aka Porsche 997 N4 Toulemonde for Porsche Carrera Cup
 Porsche 911 GT3 RSR aka Porsche 996 GT3 RSR Team IMSA Performance Matmut
 Subaru WRX STI Rally Car
 Suzuki SX4 WRC

See also
 Paris Motor Show

References

External links
Official website
Mondial de l'Automobile 2006 Gallery

Auto shows in France
Paris Motor Show
Paris Motor Show
Paris Motor Show
Events in Paris
Paris Motor Show